"Words" is a song by American R&B singer-songwriter Anthony David, from his third studio album Acey Duecy. It features fellow contemporary R&B singer-songwriter India.Arie. The song peaked at #53 on the Billboard Hot R&B/Hip-Hop Songs chart, since its release. The song was also featured on the LOGO television series Noah's Arc season 2 in 2006.  The song was nominated for a Best R&B Performance by a Duo or Group with Vocals in 2009.

Charts

References

2008 singles
2008 songs
India Arie songs
Universal Republic Records singles
Songs written by India Arie
Contemporary R&B ballads
2000s ballads